Fox Plaza may refer to:

Fox Plaza, Los Angeles
Fox Plaza, San Francisco